sec-Butylbenzene is an organic compound classified as an aromatic hydrocarbon. Its structure consists of a benzene ring substituted with a sec-butyl group. It is a flammable colorless liquid which is nearly insoluble in water but miscible with organic solvents.

Production 
sec-Butylbenzene can be produced by the reaction of benzene with either n-butyl alcohol or sec-butyl alcohol in presence of anhydrous aluminium chloride and hydrochloric acid.

References 

Alkylbenzenes
C4-Benzenes